Into the Deep is a Danish documentary film that premiered at the 2020 Sundance Film Festival on January 24, 2020. It was directed by Emma Sullivan and filmed in Copenhagen, Denmark. It was planned to be released on Netflix, but the release was postponed indefinitely when some participants stated that they had not given their consent to participate in the film. Before a subsequent release, Netflix, Plus Pictures and Sullivan agreed to re-edit the film to remove those participants who did not wish to appear. It was released globally on September 30, 2022.

It runs for 90 minutes.

Synopsis 
In 2016, Emma Sullivan, an Australian filmmaker began documenting amateur inventor Peter Madsen. One year in, Madsen murdered Swedish freelance journalist Kim Wall aboard his homemade submarine. The film is based on footage from Madsen's lab in the period leading up to the murder, as well as subsequent interviews with members of Madsen's team.

Reception 
The version that premiered at Sundance festival holds  on Rotten Tomatoes. The film is described as moving with "breathless speed".

References 

2020 films
Danish documentary films
2020 documentary films
Documentary films about criminals
Netflix original documentary films
Films shot in Copenhagen
Peter Madsen